Charles Lewis Scott (January 23, 1827 – April 30, 1899) was an American lawyer, politician, and Civil War veteran. He served two terms in the United States House of Representatives as a Democrat from California from 1857 to 1861.

Biography

Family
Charles L. Scott was born January 23, 1827, in Richmond, Virginia. His father was Robert G. Scott, a well known attorney and politician of Richmond, who was born in McIntosh County, Georgia, and died in Alabama. His mother was Susan Randolph Madison, daughter of Rt. Rev. Bishop James Madison of Virginia. His grandfather was Col. William Scott, born 1752 in Virginia and lived in Camden County, Georgia.

Education and early career 
Charles Lewis Scott attended public schools and Richmond Academy. In 1846 he graduated from the College of William and Mary, Williamsburg, Virginia. He then studied law and was admitted to the bar in 1847, practicing in Richmond.

During the 1849 California Gold Rush he went to California and mined gold.

In 1851, he resumed practicing law in Sonora.

Congress 
Scott was a member of the State assembly during 1854–1856. In 1856, he was elected to the 35th Congress, serving until 1861. While in Congress, he married a young woman he met in Mobile, Alabama.

Civil War 
When the American Civil War began, he resigned his seat in Congress and joined the Fourth Regiment, Alabama Volunteer Infantry, of the Confederate Army, serving as major. He never returned to California. In 1861 he suffered a serious leg wound at the First Battle of Bull Run. The severity of his leg pain caused him to resign his commission in 1862, after the Battle of Seven Pines.

Later career and death 
After the war, Scott farmed in Wilcox County, Alabama, then during 1869–1879 was a journalist. He was a delegate to every Democratic National Convention from the end of the Civil War to 1896. In 1885, he was appointed by President Cleveland as minister to Venezuela, serving until he resigned in 1889. He returned to the U.S. and farmed.

Scott died April 30, 1899, near Mount Pleasant, Monroe County, Alabama, and is buried at a private cemetery at Cedar Hill, Alabama.

Further reading

External links
 Retrieved on 2009-04-01
 Charles Lewis Scott (1827-1899), US Office of the Historian

1827 births
1899 deaths
Democratic Party members of the United States House of Representatives from California
People of Alabama in the American Civil War
People of California in the American Civil War
19th-century American diplomats
Politicians from Richmond, Virginia
Ambassadors of the United States to Venezuela
19th-century American politicians